Cabimbao is a Chilean village located in the province of Melipilla, Metropolitana de Santiago Region, Chile.

References

Populated places in Melipilla Province